Cherry Tree railway station serves Cherry Tree in the Blackburn with Darwen borough of Lancashire, England. It is managed by Northern, who also provide all the passenger services calling there.

The station is a two platform stop situated on the A674 road for Blackburn and was opened soon after the Blackburn to Preston line, in 1847.

The station is unstaffed, all of its permanent buildings having been demolished (shelters still survive on both platforms).  Only the western end of each platform is now used, with the sections east of the bridge on both sides now derelict.  It has been refurbished in recent years, with a Community Rail Lancashire and local authority-sponsored cleanup & repair project carried out by local schoolchildren, college students, volunteers and council workers in 2014.  The station has a long-line PA system and digital information screens in place to provide train running information.  It also has full step-free access to both platforms for disabled passengers.

As of January 2018, along with other Stations on this line, a new touch screen Ticket Machine was added to the Station.

Services

Monday to Saturdays, there is an hourly service from Cherry Tree towards Preston westbound and Blackburn, Burnley Central and Colne, eastbound. There is a two-hourly service in each direction on Sundays.

References

External links

Railway stations in Blackburn with Darwen
DfT Category F2 stations
Buildings and structures in Blackburn
Former Lancashire and Yorkshire Railway stations
Railway stations in Great Britain opened in 1847
Northern franchise railway stations
1847 establishments in England